Blessed Maria Pierina De Micheli (11 September 1890 – 26 July 1945) was a Roman Catholic religious Sister who was born near Milan in Italy. She is best known for her association with the Holy Face of Jesus (one of the Catholic devotions) and for introducing a medal bearing an image from the Shroud of Turin as part of this devotion.

In April 2009 Pope Benedict XVI advanced her beatification process by formally recognizing a miracle attributed to her. She was beatified on Sunday 30 May 2010 at the Basilica di Santa Maria Maggiore in Rome by Archbishop Angelo Amato, Prefect of the Congregation for the Causes of Saints in the Roman Curia. Although he was not present for the beatification Mass, Pope Benedict XVI noted her "extraordinary devotion" to the Holy Face of Christ at the Angelus audience the following Sunday.

Early years
She was born Giuseppina De Micheli in Milan on 11 September 1890. She had been aware from an early age of the Holy Face of Jesus devotion, which had been started almost a century earlier by a French Carmelite nun, Sister Marie of St Peter, of Tours, France. Giuseppina joined the Congregation of the Daughters of the Immaculate Conception in October 1913, and took the name Sister Maria Pierina on 16 May 1914, when she made her vows. She was then sent to the motherhouse in Buenos Aires, Argentina, where she remained until 1921. While there, her attachment to the Holy Face devotion grew stronger. After her return to Milan she was eventually elected as the mother superior of her house and began to spread the devotion.

Visions

On the first Friday in Lent 1936 she reported a vision of Christ in which Jesus appeared to her and said: “I will that My Face, which reflects the intimate pains of My Spirit, the suffering and the love of My Heart, be more honored. He who meditates upon Me, consoles Me”. Further reported visions of Jesus and Mary urged Sister Maria Pierina to make a medal with the Holy Face of Jesus. After some effort, she managed to obtain permission to reproduce the photograph of the Shroud of Turin and  authorization from the Curia in Milan to proceed with the medal in 1940. This became known as the Holy Face Medal.

On one side the medal bears a replica of the Holy Shroud of Turin and an inscription based on Psalm 66:2: "Illumina, Domine, vultum tuum super nos", i.e. "May, O Lord, the light of Thy countenance shine upon us". On the other side of the medal, there is an image of a radiant Sacred Host, the monogram of the Holy Name ("IHS"), and the inscription "Mane nobiscum, Domine" i.e. "Stay with us, O Lord".

Approval of the Holy Face medal
The first medal of the Holy Face was offered to Pope Pius XII who approved the devotion and the medal. She had also reported that Jesus wanted a special Feast on the day before Ash Wednesday in honor of His Holy Face, to be preceded by a Novena (9 days) of prayers. In 1958, Pope Pius XII declared the Feast of the Holy Face of Jesus as Shrove Tuesday (the Tuesday before Ash Wednesday) for all Roman Catholics.

Final years
In 1941 she wrote in her diary: "I feel a deep longing to live always united to Jesus, to love Him intensely because my death can only be a transport of love with my Spouse, Jesus." Sister Maria Pierina died on 26 July 1945 in Milan. Her remains are located at the Holy Spirit Institute in Rome.

See also

 Leo Dupont, Apostle of the Holy Face
 Maria Pia Mastena
 Oratory of the Holy Face
 Sisters of the Reparation of the Holy Face
 The Golden Arrow Holy Face Devotion (Prayer)

References

Sources
 Maria Ildefonsa Rigamonti, Missionary or messenger of the Holy Face: Sister Maria Pierina de Micheli, St. Leonards-on-Sea: King Bros., 1957
Dorothy Scallan, Emeric B Scallan, 1994 The Life & Revelations of Sr. Mary of St. Peter 
Joan Carroll Cruz, Saintly Men of Modern Times. (2003)

External links

The Holy Face Association
Holy Face Devotion in the UK

1890 births
1945 deaths
20th-century venerated Christians
Italian beatified people
Catholic spirituality
Catholic devotions
Visions of Jesus and Mary
Religious leaders from Milan
Beatifications by Pope Benedict XVI
20th-century Italian women
Venerated Catholics by Pope Benedict XVI